Anikudichan (South) is a village in the Udayarpalayam taluk of Ariyalur district, Tamil Nadu, India.

Demographics 

As per the 2001 census, Anikudichan (South) had a total population of 2730 with 1335 males and 1395 females.

References 

Villages in Ariyalur district